Aberdeen has been the host of several theatres and concert halls through history. Some of them have been converted or destroyed over the years.

Theatres

Theatre Royal 

The Theatre Royal was located on Theatre lane, in Aberdeen. It was built in 1789 and demolished in 1877 when replaced by the Tivoli although the same source says that another Theatre Royal in Aberdeen is now a church.

Tivoli 

The Tivoli is located on Guild Street. "It was built in 1872 as Her Majesty's Theatre by C. J. Phipps and James Matthews. The auditorium was later rebuilt by Frank Matcham in 1897 and again in 1909. In 2009 it was bought by a trust, with the intention of renovating it. Work on the exterior work started November 2010, and while it was scheduled to last six months, it took until 2013 until it reopened.

HMT 

His Majesty's Theatre in Aberdeen is the largest theatre in north-east Scotland, seating 1,470. The theatre is sited on Rosemount Viaduct, opposite the city's Union Terrace Gardens. It was designed by Frank Matcham and opened in 1906.
The theatre is managed by Aberdeen Performing Arts which also runs The Music Hall, Aberdeen Box Office and the Lemon Tree.

Aberdeen Arts Centre 

Aberdeen Arts Centre is a theatre on King Street in Aberdeen, Scotland.
The 350-seater auditorium regularly plays host to music and drama events and is the focus for much of Aberdeen's amateur dramatic activities.
The theatre is on two levels, with an upper and a lower gallery for audiences. There is a small orchestra pit and behind the stage there are dressing and rehearsal rooms for the shows and other projects such as local drama groups.

The Lemon Tree
The Lemon Tree is a studio theatre that hosts touring companies and occasionally generates in-house productions. Operation was transferred from a local trust to Aberdeen Performing Arts in 2008.

Aberdeen Cinemas Theatre

The Belmont

Belmont Cinema is in Belmont Street. The Belmont is now an arts cinema which shows films that generally would not be shown in a chain cinema. It is part of the Picturehouse Cinemas network of arthouse cinemas.

Capitol Theatre 

The Capitol Theatre is located on Union Street. It has also been known as the Capitol Super Cinema or the Electric Theatre. The building is Category B statutory listed.

The Capitol Cinema opened in February 1933, on the site of the earlier Electric Cinema, seating 2,100 to the plans of architects AGR Mackenzie and Clement George. In 1933, the Capitol was the most luxurious cinema, with full stage facilities and a Compton Organ.
The Capitol closed for regular film showings in the 1960s, but it was used also for occasional rock concerts until the late 1990s; it was largely moth-balled since 1998, except for the use of the restaurant as a bar called "Oscars". The B-listed Art deco interior was extremely well preserved at that point. Permission was granted in 2002–03 for conversion to nightclubs, which saw the auditorium split horizontally to form two large bar-clubs, and the rear stage wall cut open to create a large glass wall and additional entrances. The original restaurant is now out of use. Plans to restore and return the Compton pipe organ to the building have never taken place.

In 2011, Aberdeen City Council has consulted The Theatres Trust on the partial demolition of the Capitol Theatre in order to create a hotel accommodation with an associated access and parking The plan, submitted by "Prime Properties Aberdeen c/o A B Robb Ltd", proposes "a change of use of bar/nightclub to Class 7 Hotel with associated part demolition of the existing auditorium and development of hotel accommodation and refurbishment of internal features and associated access and parking" The conditions set by the council however included the approval of:
 the conservation methods for the restoration of the art deco interior and exterior of the building
 specification, location and dimensions for dismantling, relocating and reassembling the original organ pipe screen, organ niches, Compton organ and proscenium arch within the proposed conference room
 details of the restoration and refurbishment of the external canopy and entrance doors, new shop front, entrance lobby and stair and the first floor tea room to recreate the original character and appearance of the building

Also, that the restored art deco café/tea room shown on drawings should not be used unless fully open to the general public, unless the planning authority has given written consent for a variation.

The Palace Theatre 
The Palace Theatre, located on Bridge Street, was built following destruction by fire in 1896 of the People’s Palace on the same site. The interior of the new Palace, originally with two tiers, was completely gutted to the shell walls in 1929 and rebuilt, re-opening as a cinema with one balcony in 1931. The four-storey asymmetrical granite front survives largely intact, but this is a crude design of industrial quality - plain with a pediment over the three central bays and three large doorways with thin broken segmental pediments.

Concerts and reception halls

Music Hall 

The Music Hall is a concert hall in Aberdeen, Scotland, formerly the city's Assembly Rooms, located on Union Street in the city centre. It was designed by architect Archibald Simpson, costing £11,500 when it was originally constructed in 1822, opened to the public as a concert hall in 1859, and was extensively renovated in the 1980s.

Beach Ballroom 
The Beach Ballroom is an art deco building on the sea front of Aberdeen, Scotland. It is home to one of Scotland's finest dance floors - famous for its bounce - which floats on fixed steel springs.

Elphinstone Hall 
Elphinstone Hall is the hall of the University of Aberdeen. It is located on their Kings College Campus.

Aberdeen Art Gallery 
The Aberdeen Art Gallery is mostly known for its art exhibitions. However, they also have receptions areas available for custom events.

Other theatres, halls and cinema 

 The Alhambra Theatre
 Empire Music Hall, later Kings, 1907
 Dove Paterson's Palladium, Shiprow, 1908
 The Torry Picture Palace, 1910
 The Woodside Picture Palace (The Rinkie), 1910
 Star Picture Palace
 The Globe
 Savoy, 1012
 The Queen's Cinema (formerly The Queen's Rooms), 1912–1981
 La Scala, 1914
 The Picture House, 1914
 The West End (The Playhouse)
 Casino, Wales Street, 1916–1959
 Picturedrome (Cinema House), 1924–1971
 Pooles Palace (Aberdeen's first full-time talkie house), 1931–1959
 Grand Central, 1929
 Regent (Odeon), 1932–2002
 The Astoria
 The Victoria (Inverurie), 1935
 The City Cinema, 1935–1963
 The Picture House (Stonehaven), 1936–82
 The News Cinema, 1936
 The Curzon, 1959
 The Cosmo 2, 1964–1977
 The Majestic (replaced La Scala), 1936–1973
 The Kingsway, 1936 (survived then as a bingo hall)
 The Regal (building started before the war), opened 1954

References 

Architecture in Scotland
Theatres in Aberdeen